William Ivey Long II (born August 30, 1947) is an American costume designer for stage and film.  His most notable work includes the Broadway shows The Producers, Hairspray, Nine, Crazy for You, Grey Gardens, Young Frankenstein, Cinderella, Bullets Over Broadway and On the Twentieth Century.

Biography

Early life and education
Long was born in Raleigh, North Carolina on August 30, 1947, to William Ivey Long Sr., a Winthrop University professor and stage director, and his wife Mary, who was a high school theatre teacher, actress and playwright. His father was the founder of the Winthrop University theatre department. William grew up in Manteo, North Carolina and Rock Hill, South Carolina.

Upon graduation from high school Long attended the College of William and Mary where he studied history and graduated in 1969, after spending many of his high school and undergraduate summers with his family at Manteo, North Carolina, where Mary, William, Robert, and Laura worked for Paul Green's outdoor drama, The Lost Colony. He then attended the University of North Carolina at Chapel Hill to pursue a Ph.D. in art history.  At Chapel Hill he met visiting professor Betty Smith who suggested he apply to the design program at Yale University.  He left UNC and went to the Yale School of Drama to study set design. It was here that he met Sigourney Weaver (his roommate at the time), Wendy Wasserstein, Meryl Streep, Christopher Durang, and Paul Rudnick, who were all also students at the university. While at Yale he studied under designer Ming Cho Lee, whom he has credited with being a major influence on his work.

Career
Upon his graduation from Yale in 1975, he moved to New York City where he worked for couturier Charles James as an unpaid apprentice until James's death in 1978. A friend of his from Yale, Karen Schulz, who was the set designer for a Broadway revival of Nikolai Gogol's The Inspector General, suggested that Long be hired to do costume designs for the show. This marked Long's first Broadway production; he has since designed for over 60 Broadway shows.

He has been nominated for eighteen Tony Awards, winning six (for Nine, Crazy for You, The Producers, Hairspray, Grey Gardens, and Cinderella). He has also won the Drama Desk Award for outstanding costume design for Hairspray, The Producers, Guys and Dolls, Lend Me a Tenor, and Nine. Other recent credits include Young Frankenstein, The Ritz, Chicago, and Curtains.

In 2000 Long was chosen by the National Theatre Conference as its "Person of the Year" and was honored with the "Legend of Fashion" Award by the Art Institute of Chicago in 2003. He was inducted into the American Theater Hall of Fame for 2005.

He remains active in many local activities throughout the state of North Carolina including working with Paul Green's The Lost Colony Outdoor Drama in Manteo, North Carolina which he and his family have been a part of since he was a young child.  The Cameron Art Museum in Wilmington, North Carolina featured an exhibition of Long's designs titled "Between Taste and Travesty: Costume Designs by William Ivey Long."

"Long's creations have had a tendency to become as much of a celebrity as the people who wear them," wrote Encore Magazine's art columnist, Lauren Hodges. "His pieces are so lively that they seem to have personalities on their own. The movements the costumes were made for seem to reflect in the fabric. Each detail is lovingly stitched for the characters of the stage and speaks of the story itself, giving the viewer a little taste of the spectacle that is Broadway."

Long has also costumed for Siegfried & Roy at the Mirage Hotel, Leonard Bernstein's operas A Quiet Place and Trouble in Tahiti, and ballets at the New York City Ballet for Peter Martins, Paul Taylor and Twyla Tharp.

In June 2012, he was elected Chairman of The American Theatre Wing. He was the first working theatre artist to hold this position since Helen Hayes.

Sexual assault allegations 
In an August 2018 BuzzFeed News report, Long was accused of having sexually harassed a props assistant while working on The Lost Colony in 1996. In November 2021, National Public Radio published an article detailing accusations of sexual abuse and predatory behavior against Long. Long was accused of assaulting a costumer designer during the summer of 2001, and assaulting another props assistant/actor over multiple summers. A lawsuit against Long and others filed by a production manager for The Lost Colony was settled out of court. "Those accusations [in the lawsuit] included forcing one young man to have sex with another man at Long's direction, while an RIHA board member watched. The same man claimed that Long performed oral sex on him against his wishes, and that Long also tried to make him find 'young boys with whom Mr. Long could engage in homosexual activity.'" Long has denied these allegations.

Productions

Broadway

The Inspector General – 1978
The 1940's Radio Hour – 1979
Passione – 1980
Mass Appeal – 1981
Nine – 1982
The Tap Dance Kid – 1983
Play Memory – 1984
End of the World – 1984
Smile – 1986
Sleight of Hand – 1987
Mail – 1988
Eastern Seaboard – 1989
Lend Me a Tenor – 1989
Welcome to the Club – 1989
Six Degrees of Separation – 1990
The Homecoming – 1991
Crazy for You – 1992
Private Lives – 1992
Guys and Dolls – 1992
Laughter on the 23rd Floor – 1993
Picnic – 1994
Smokey Joe's Cafe – 1995
Company – 1995
Big – 1996
Chicago – 1996
Steel Pier – 1997
King David – 1997
1776 – 1997
Cabaret – 1998
Annie Get Your Gun – 1999
The Civil War – 1999
Epic Proportions – 1999
Swing! – 1999
Contact – 2000
The Music Man – 2000
The Man Who Came to Dinner – 2000
Seussical – 2000
The Producers – 2001
Thou Shalt Not – 2001
45 Seconds from Broadway – 2001
Hairspray – 2002
Little Shop of Horrors – 2003
The Boy From Oz – 2003
Never Gonna Dance – 2003
Twentieth Century – 2004
The Frogs – 2004
La Cage aux Folles – 2004
A Streetcar Named Desire – 2005
Sweet Charity – 2005
The Caine Mutiny Court-Martial – 2006
Grey Gardens – 2006
Curtains – 2007
The Ritz – 2007
Young Frankenstein – 2007
Pal Joey – 2008
9 to 5 – 2009
Looped – 2010
Catch Me If You Can – 2011
Hugh Jackman: Back on Broadway – 2011
Don't Dress for Dinner – 2012
Leap of Faith – 2012
Drood – 2012
Cinderella – 2013
Big Fish – 2013
Bullets Over Broadway – 2014
Cabaret – 2014
On the Twentieth Century – 2015
It Shoulda Been You – 2015
Disaster! – 2016
A Bronx Tale – 2016
Prince of Broadway – 2017
Tootsie – 2019
Beetlejuice – 2019 
Diana – 2021

Off Broadway

Two Small Bodies
Conjuring an Event
The Vienna Notes
Mass Appeal
Passione
True West
Hunting Scenes from Lower Bavaria
Sister Mary Ignatius Explains It All for You
The Actor's Nightmare
Twelve Dreams
Poor Little Lambs
American Passion
The Lady and the Clarinet
Hey, Ma...Kaye Ballard
After the Fall
The Marriage of Bette and Boo
Hamlet
Principia Scriptoriae
Wenceslas Square
Italian American Reconciliation
Eleemosynary
Assassins
The Food Chain
Splendora
Tovah: Out of Her Mind
The Mystery of Irma Vep
La Terrasse
Contact
Godspell
The Syringa Tree
A Bad Friend
Valhalla
Grey Gardens
Princesses
Canned Ham
The School for Lies
Lucky Guy
The Belle of Amherst

Touring productions
Dreamgirls

Film
Life with Mikey – 1993
The Cutting Edge – 1992
Curtain Call – 1999
Chop Suey – 2001
The Producers – 2005

Television
Ask Me Again – 1989
Crazy for You – 1999
The Man Who Came to Dinner – 2000
Grease: Live – 2016
The Rocky Horror Picture Show: Let's Do the Time Warp Again – 2016
A Christmas Story Live! – 2017

References
Bibliography
 Don Quaintance and Deborah Velders, eds. (2007), Between Taste and Travesty: Costume Designs by William Ivey Long, Wilmington, North Carolina: Cameron Museum of Art | 

Notes

External links
 William Ivey Long official website
 
 
 
William Ivey Long's New York on NYC ARTS
William Ivey Long Keeps His Clothes On, by Alex Witchel, NYT 29 January 2006
Guide to the William Ivey Long Honorary Materials 2007-2011

1947 births
Living people
People from Seaboard, North Carolina
American costume designers
Tony Award winners
Yale School of Drama alumni
College of William & Mary alumni
People from Raleigh, North Carolina
People from Manteo, North Carolina